

The cruciform tail is an aircraft empennage configuration which, when viewed from the aircraft's front or rear, looks much like a cross. The usual arrangement is to have the horizontal stabilizer intersect the vertical tail somewhere near the middle, and above the top of the fuselage. The design is often used to locate the horizontal stabilizer away from jet exhaust, propeller and wing wake, as well as to provide undisturbed airflow to the rudder.

Prominent examples of aircraft with cruciform tails include the Avro Canada CF-100 Canuck, the British Aerospace Jetstream 31, the Fairchild Swearingen Metroliner, and the Rockwell B-1 Lancer.

See also
 Pelikan tail
 T-tail
 Twin tail
 V-tail

References

Cruciform tail aircraft